José Francisco Capellán (January 13, 1981 – April 7, 2015) was a Dominican professional baseball pitcher. He played in Major League Baseball from 2004 to 2008 for the Atlanta Braves, Milwaukee Brewers, Detroit Tigers and Colorado Rockies. He also played with the Hanhwa Eagles of the KBO League.

Career
In 2004, Capellán pitched at Single-A, Double-A, and Triple-A and posted a combined 14–5 mark with a 2.80 earned run average (ERA). In three games with the Atlanta Braves after a September call-up in 2004, Capellán compiled a 0–1 record with an 11.25 ERA in eight innings pitched.

The Braves traded Capellán and Alec Zumwalt to the Milwaukee Brewers for all-star reliever Dan Kolb.

Capellán opened the 2005 season with the Triple-A Nashville Sounds, and was called up to Brewers major league club, where he worked relief through the 2005 season. At the end of spring training in 2007, he was sent back to Triple-A after a poor spring. Capellán demanded a trade and even considered retirement. His wish eventually came true on July 1, 2007, when he was traded to the Detroit Tigers for minor league pitcher Chris Cody.

Capellán was traded from Detroit to the Rockies in exchange for pitcher Denny Bautista on December 4, 2007. On May 5, 2008, Capellán was released by the Rockies after being designated for assignment. In late June, Capellán signed a minor league contract with the Kansas City Royals and became a free agent after the season.

Capellán signed a minor league contract with the Houston Astros on January 14, 2009, and was invited to spring training.

The Hanhwa Eagles, a Korean professional baseball club, revealed their acquisition of Capellán on December 10, 2009. Capellán was considered to be a starter for the Eagles in 2010 and scheduled to make $250,000 a year. He was released from the Eagles on August 5, 2010.

In between, Capellan pitched winterball with the Gigantes del Cibao and the Toros del Este in Dominican Republic, and for the Tigres de Aragua in Venezuela, where he made his last professional appearance in 2013.

Death
Capellán died of a heart attack at home in Philadelphia on April 7, 2015, aged 34. Capellán's wife said that he had problems with the drug Ambien, which is used for sleeping disorders.

References

External links

1981 births
2015 deaths
Atlanta Braves players
Colorado Rockies players
Colorado Springs Sky Sox players
Danville Braves players
Detroit Tigers players
Dominican Republic expatriate baseball players in South Korea
Dominican Republic expatriate baseball players in the United States
Gigantes del Cibao players
Greenville Braves players
Gulf Coast Braves players
Hanwha Eagles players
Huntsville Stars players

Major League Baseball pitchers
Major League Baseball players from the Dominican Republic
Milwaukee Brewers players
Myrtle Beach Pelicans players
Nashville Sounds players
Omaha Royals players
People from Cotuí
Richmond Braves players
Rome Braves players
Round Rock Express players
Tigres de Aragua players
Toledo Mud Hens players
Toros del Este players
Dominican Republic expatriate baseball players in Venezuela